Howard W. Blake High School is a public magnet high school, with an emphasis on the arts, in Tampa, Florida, United States. It is operated by the School District of Hillsborough County. Originally opened in 1956 as a school for African-Americans, it was integrated as a junior high school after the end of segregation. The current building opened in 1997, when Blake again became a high school.

History
Don Thompson Vocational High School opened as a segregated school for African-Americans in 1956. It was soon renamed Howard W. Blake Comprehensive High School in honor of Howard Wesley Blake, an African-American educator and educational activist from Tampa.

The original Blake High School closed after the 1970–71 school year as Hillsborough County Public Schools desegregated. It reopened in the following year as Blake 7th Grade Center, an integrated school that only taught one grade level of students. In the early 1990s, the school housed students from 7th through 9th grade and was renamed Blake Junior High School, a middle school. This school closed in 1996, and the old building was demolished soon thereafter.

Magnet school
In the fall of 1997, the Blake name was transferred to Blake High School, a new high school housed in a new building opened as a magnet school for the visual, communication and performing arts.

The 2007–2008 school year marked Blake's 10th anniversary as a magnet school. Part of the celebration was organised by the school's Magnet Arts Coordinator. Her event for the anniversary featured Blake alumni from the previous ten years, and included gallery pieces and performances by artists such as Ari Richter and Chicago's star of Wicked, Dan'yelle Williamson.

The school performed the play Too Much Light Makes the Baby Go Blind and the choir and symphony orchestra performed the Requiem by Mozart.

Academic standards 

Blake Accelerated Curriculum Program'is an online high school magnet program in the school district of Hillsborough County. It is one of seven franchises of Florida Virtual School. Students only report to campus for FCAT testing, and optional extracurricular activities. Students can customize their education to be accelerated or to just accommodate their needs. Some students accelerate their high school career and graduate 1–2 years early.

Graduation rate
In 2012 Blake's graduation rate was 80% as compared to a statewide rate of 74.5% and a Hillsborough County rate of 72.6%.

Florida Department of Education grade
 2014 - B
 2013 - B
 2012 - B
 2011 - B
 2010 - A
 2009 - D
 2008 - D
 2007 - D
 2006 - C
 2005 - C
 2004 - D
 2003 - C
 2002 - C
 2001 - C
 2000 - C
 1999 - C

Magnet programs

Theater

The theater program provides for the study of drama, musical theater and technical theater/design. The theater department is part of the International Thespian Society and competes annually at Florida State Thespians, where they have won Superior ratings in virtually all categories. The theater department produces seven shows a year: two plays, two musicals, a musical concert, a one-act play, and a Senior Showcase.

Many students of the theater department have continued into university or community theater. Several have appeared professionally on stage or screen, such as:
Danyelle Williamson, actress
 Shannon Magrane, singer
 Taylor Trensch, actor 
 Owen Teague, actor

During their high school careers, Blake students have worked as actors, directors, playwrights, stage managers, designers, and technicians. Some have worked at local theaters in the Tampa Bay area, including the American Stage Theatre, FreeFall Theatre, Stageworks, and Jobsite.

Music
Blake High School offers a music curriculum consisting of band, orchestra, choir, guitar, piano, harp, jazz ensembles and marching band in addition to theory and history courses. The faculty of the music department comprises eight persons. There are opportunities for music students to perform in the community in All-State, All-County, Music Performance Assessment, and Solo and Ensemble festivals.

Dance department
The department is headed by two teachers who teach ballet and modern dance, including master classes. The department is host to guest faculties, and hosts classes from Dance Repertory, Ballet, Modern (Jazz, Pilate) Master Classes, Choreography I & II, Dance Honors and Senior Projects. With these the department runs five shows a year, two faculty shows, two student choreographies and one Senior Showcase. Some students participate in the Youth American International Grand Prix.

Creative writing
As in all the other majors at Blake High School, creative writing majors are selected by the department teachers through an audition process. Students wishing to be in the program prepare a portfolio of their writing, and submit an application to be seen. At the end of their four years the students will be able to publish a chapbook of their best work.

Journalism
The journalism program is working on having all their material posted via their new website. The program has achieved awards at school competitions such as the Florida Scholastic Press Association. Students are selected to be in the program based on their portfolios containing previous editorials, short stories, articles, and any other writing. There is then an interview with the advisor for the program.

Visual arts
Visual arts students are selected for enrollment through an audition process that considers all their works of art, sketchbooks, potential, academic achievement, and attendance. Visual arts students take all level-one courses in drawing, painting, printmaking, jewelry, photography, sculpture and ceramics. Students can then decide to take level 2 and 3 classes in any given fine art. By the end of their junior year, they may audition to become an AP studio / portfolio student and will concentrate in one media.

Master certification is available for students who are willing to work extra hard to have ten (instead of the usual eight) visual art credits by the time they graduate, including AP Art History. Students attend professional artist lectures, gallery openings, and submit work to contests.

Television and film
TV/Film students are selected by an audition process. The award-winning TV and Film Production program prepares students for careers in the broadcast and film industries. From scriptwriting to video editing, students will develop skills necessary to become a broadcast journalist and/ or filmmaker. Whether it's participating in student short film contests, covering live events as a reporter, or hosting a radio podcast, the choices are endless as a crew member of the WBUZ team.

Athletics

Men's
Men's sports include swimming, basketball, baseball, cross country, football, golf, soccer, track and field, tennis, and wrestling.

Women's
Women's sports include swimming, flag football, soccer, cross country, tennis, softball, volleyball, basketball, and cheerleading.

Alumni
 Ryan Davis, former NFL player
 Earl Edwards, former NFL player
 Eddie McMillan, former NFL player
 Leon McQuay, former NFL player
 Isaiah Rodgers, NFL player

References

External links
 School website
  hwbsota.org - Blake High School Friends of the Arts website
 BlakeTheater.com - Department of Theater website

Educational institutions established in 1956
1956 establishments in Florida
Educational institutions established in 1997
1997 establishments in Florida
Schools of the performing arts in the United States
High schools in Tampa, Florida
Public high schools in Florida
Magnet schools in Florida